In mathematics, a Beurling zeta function is an analogue of the Riemann zeta function where the ordinary primes are replaced by a set of Beurling generalized primes: any sequence of real numbers greater than 1 that tend to infinity.

A Beurling generalized integer is a number that can be written as a product of Beurling generalized primes. Beurling generalized the usual prime number theorem to Beurling generalized primes. He showed that if the number N(x) of Beurling generalized integers less than x is of the form N(x) = Ax + O(x log−γx) with γ > 3/2  then the number of Beurling generalized primes less than x is asymptotic to x/log x, just as for ordinary primes, 
but if γ = 3/2 then this conclusion need not hold.

See also
 Abstract analytic number theory

References

Zeta and L-functions